The Norias of Hama are a series of 17 norias, historic water-raising machines for irrigation, along the Orontes River in the city of Hama, Syria. They are tall water wheels with box-like water collection compartments embedded around their rims. As the river flows, it pushes these water collection boxes under water, where they quickly fill up, then are driven up to the top of the wheel where they empty into an aqueduct. The aqueduct can carry the water to supply buildings, gardens and farmland.

Seventeen of Hama's original norias have been conserved. They are notable for their medieval origins, for their large number and for the enormous size of two of them - for nearly 500 years the tallest waterwheels in the world. In the 21st century Hama's norias no longer provide a water supply but are celebrated as an example of advanced water supply technology in medieval Muslim societies and for the striking sights and sounds which they make as they turn. In 2006 the older of the two gigantic norias, the Noria al-Muhammadiya (1361 CE), was accorded Historic Mechanical Engineering Landmark designation by the American Society of Mechanical Engineers as marking a major step forward in technology internationally.

Early History 
There are strong grounds for believing that many norias were operating in Hama at least by late 12th century CE. Specific dates are known for the two exceptionally large norias from their inscriptions: Noria al-Muhammadiya created in 1361 CE and Noria al-Ma’muriyya in 1453 CE.

However, it is wholly possible that some norias were operating in Hama some centuries earlier. A 13th century regional historian wrote that norias existed in Hama in the late 9th century CE. Norias were in use near Hama by 350 CE, judging from mosaic and tiles bearing images of norias which have been found at Apamea, a Roman city, also on the Orontes, 30 miles / 55 km downstream from Hama. These images of norias show a strikingly similar design to those in Hama today.

In the mid-7th century CE, the area around Hama was conquered and absorbed into the expanding Muslim Arab state. The latter assiduously mastered new technologies which it encountered - like norias - improved them and expanded their uses. The very first norias in Hama might have been built in the Roman / Byzantine period or they might have been built by the subsequent Muslim society, using the established local design.

An obvious reason for building norias at Hama is the Orontes’ lack of gradient combined with the height of its banks, which make this the most practical option for drawing irrigation water from the river.

Dates for these norias’ origins refer to the original noria at a site because, like all functioning historic waterwheels, Hama's norias have been repeatedly repaired and rebuilt over the centuries, since wooden parts continually need replacing. On one estimate, if well-maintained, a noria will have undergone complete replacement of its wooden parts every 15 years. In Hama such maintenance of norias is carried out by families of skilled noria carpenters who pass this role down the generations, a practice which has survived until present times.

Features of the Hama norias

The water wheels 

The wheels are the ‘undershot’ type, driven by water flowing underneath them and pushing the wheel's paddles. These wheels are made from different woods for different parts. The massive axles and bearings are walnut wood, while poplar was widely used for other parts of the wheel and pine and oak have also been mentioned. Small wooden water collection compartments are embedded all along the rim of the water wheel in between the paddles with which the river drives the wheel. They are like boxes with half of one side open and with a spout whereby the water pours out at the highest point of rotation (see close-up photo below). Most Hama norias have a water collection box between every pair of paddles. But on some they are more widely spaced, for instance one box between every five paddles. In water-bearing capacity, across different norias the boxes range from 4 to 12 litres (1 to 3 US gallons). The water delivery of Hama's norias ranges between 50,000 and 200,000 litres per hour, depending on a noria's size (13,200 to 52,800 US gallons). Brief descriptions of each of 14 norias in Hama are provided in the report by the American Society of Mechanical Engineers concerning its designation of the Noria al-Muhammadiya as a Historic Mechanical Engineering Landmark.

The weirs 
Hama's norias are always immediately downstream from a weir, a low dam which ensures that river power is concentrated through a channel leading to the noria's wheel. When river levels are low, all water may flow through the noria channel in the weir; when the river is high, surplus water simply flows over the weir. There are often additional channels in these weirs and sluice gates to fine tune river pressure on the water wheel and hence the speed with which a noria turns. Al Dbiyat's description of the Hama norias contains a diagram which conveys these features clearly. Sometimes two, three or even four norias share the same weir, with one or two norias on each side of the river. This clustering of norias is evident on Al Dbiyat's map of the Hama norias  and to a discerning viewer on satellite view maps of Hama. Sometimes a weir is constructed at an angle to a noria so as to concentrate river power to the maximum on the channel leading to the wheel.

The aqueducts 
The norias discharge water into aqueducts built on tall stone arches. To catch the water, each aqueduct has a very short section parallel to the water wheel and the river. This joins at 90 degrees the main section of the aqueduct, which leads away from the river and was sometimes many hundreds of metres long. Some aqueducts receive water from two norias of the same height, one on each side of the short section parallel to the water wheel. Much of the aqueducts’ length has now been demolished and today few aqueducts continue very far.

Water sharing systems 
When the norias were being used for irrigation, the aqueducts eventually fed into water channels which each supplied multiple fruit and vegetable gardens. While most Hama norias were owned by wealthy landowners, their costs, maintenance and their water were shared on an orderly collective basis by each noria's water users. Such systems for orderly sharing of water are widely practised in traditional Muslim societies. Gardeners often timeshare the water through quickly adjusting small makeshift dams of stones and rags which direct the flow at branches of water channels.

The Noria al-Muhammadiya 
It was built to supply water to the Great Mosque of Hama one kilometre away (0.63 mile) and it also supplied a public hammam (bath-house) and fountains, houses and gardens nearby. A construction date of 1361 CE is established by an inscription on its aqueduct, stating year 763 of the Islamic calendar.

This noria has 120 water collection boxes embedded in its rim. They raise 200,000 litres of water per hour (52,800 US gallons). The wheel takes one minute to complete a revolution, much longer than smaller norias.

To drive a wheel bearing such a weight of water, an extraordinarily long weir at a very acute angle was built to concentrate the power of the river on the base of the wheel. This arrangement can be seen clearly on satellite view maps of Hama.

For nearly 500 years, the Noria al-Muhammadiya was the tallest waterwheel in the world. In 1854 it was surpassed by the Laxey Wheel, a mine-pumping waterwheel on the Isle of Man, an island between England and Ireland.

From irrigation devices to heritage attractions 
From the 1930s to late 1950s Hama's norias were competing with new irrigation pumps driven by petrol or diesel engines. Motorised pumps offered entrepreneurial farmers a means to get extra water to grow more food for expanding populations. A severe blow to the norias came in 1960 with the building of the Rastan dam upstream from Hama. This reduced water levels in the Orontes so that for several months of the year Hama's norias could no longer operate and motorised pumps became the only means for continuous irrigation. Spells of non-use causes the wood in the norias to dry, shrink and crack, which makes maintenance costly. By 1970 the number of norias in use had fallen to eight, from the 20 noted by Danish archaeologists in Hama in the 1930s. Between 1977 and 1981 six norias were restored.

In February 1982 the army of Syria's first Baathist dictator, Hafez Assad, launched a massive attack on Hama to crush an armed uprising by the Muslim Brotherhood. For three weeks the city was bombed by aeroplanes, shelled by artillery and tanks, and finally large areas were demolished with dynamite and bulldozers. Many thousands of Hama citizens were killed. Heritage buildings like Hama's Great Mosque were levelled to the ground and large parts of historic Hama were rendered wholly unrecognisable. According to Hafez Assad's favoured British biographer, “about a third of the historic inner city was demolished…. The whole of Hama was reshaped on a grand scale”. Concerning impact on Hama's norias, information is scarce because the Assad government firmly discouraged mention of the 1982 events. According to a non-government source, it seems that the wooden norias themselves did not suffer widespread damage and were turning again within months. An important unanswered question is whether it was in 1982 that the norias’ stone aqueducts suffered the extensive demolition which now precludes any useful delivery of water.

The Assad government selectively rebuilt a limited part of historic Hama, like the Great Mosque, and landscaped or redeveloped the rest. The norias played an important part in the government's promotion of Hama as a tourist destination. The restoration of norias continued, reaching a peak in 1988 when seven norias were restored. The result has been 17 norias which rotate and raise water but cannot deliver it far because their aqueducts are now cut short. They function as a popular heritage attraction, floodlit during events like the Hama Spring Festival when the Orontes flows well and the norias can turn. By day or night they can be visually spectacular, catching light in the curtains of spray dripping from their water-boxes or casting huge rotating shadows. Sound wise, many of Hama's norias emit the powerful groaning, droning or buzzing sounds from their thick wooden axles, which gave norias their name. A time-honoured sport among Hama youths is to ride on moving norias, sometimes diving into the river from the top, as displayed in an on-line video from 2005. Much of the illustration and information now available about Hama's norias derives from these 17 norias during the period between the 1980s and the 2011 Syrian civil war. In 1999 the Syrian government applied to UNESCO for the norias of Hama to be designated a World Heritage Site.

Hama’s norias and the Syrian civil war 
Hama's norias were largely spared damage during the civil war which began in 2011. Since Hama was famous as a conservative and militant Sunni Muslim city, where hatred of the secular Baathist dictatorship had been intensified by the 1982 massacre, it was an expected focal point for rebellion. Accordingly, the dictatorship of Bashar Assad made strenuous efforts to retain control of Hama from the outset. In July and August 2011 it used massive lethal force against large crowds of demonstrators in Hama. Subsequently, the Assad government retained control of the city so Hama never suffered the air raids which the government inflicted on areas controlled by its opponents.

Most of Hama's norias have survived. The American Association for the Advancement of Science compared pre-war satellite photos of 10 noria sites in Hama with those from 2014 and concluded that no major damage had occurred. However, one noria was burned deliberately in 2014, some have been pillaged for timber, and others are suffering from lack of maintenance. A mid-2020 article in the on-line English language magazine Arab Weekly interviewed traditional noria craftsmen who were restoring Hama's Noria al-Muhammadiya and also a Hama official responsible for the norias. While local citizen initiatives to revive the norias were underway, it was proving difficult for lack of money for materials and a serious shortage of suitably skilled traditional noria craftsmen, owing to death or emigration during the conflict.

Gallery

References

Further reading

 Delpech, Annette; Girard, Francois; Robine, Gerard, Roumi, Muhammad (1997) Les Norias de l’Oronte. Institut francais de Damas, Damascus, Syria

This 240-page French language book, much illustrated and including maps, gives the definitive account of the norias of Hama.

 Samman, Mahmod (2006) Noria al-Muhammadiya: Historic Mechanical Engineering Landmark. American Society of Mechanical Engineers.

This 11-page English language booklet, full text available on the internet, summarises key facts about the Hama norias, drawing on the book by Delpech et al.

 Al Dbiyat, Mohamed (2009) ‘Les norias de Hama sur l'Oronte, un système traditionnel original de l'utilisation de l'eau fluviale’, in Gestion durable et équitable de l’eau douce en Méditerranée , mémoire et traditions, avenir et solutions. Conference proceedings from Cinquièmes Rencontres Internationales Monaco et la Méditerranée Monaco, 26–28 March 2009.

This 18-page French language chapter also draws on the book by Delpech et al and has a focus on water usage. Maps and diagrams are included. Full text available via the ResearchGate website.

External links
Sound and video of Norias on Sound Tourism site
‘Hama’s Majestic Norias’
‘Digital Hama: a Window on Syria’s Past’ Historical Knowledge, National Museum of Denmark

Aqueducts in Syria
Buildings and structures in Hama
Articles containing video clips